Francis Hill (1899–1980) was a British solicitor and historian.

Francis Hill may also refer to:

 Francis Manning Hill (1809–1854), Canadian lawyer and politician
 Francis Hill (cricketer) (1862–c. 1935), English cricketer
 Francis William Clegg-Hill, 5th Viscount Hill (1866–1924), British peer

See also 
 Frank Hill (disambiguation)
 Hill (surname)